Broad Bottom is an unincorporated community in Pike County, Kentucky, United States.

History
Broad Bottom was named for its location "in a low-lying area" next to Levisa Fork.  A post office opened in 1924, and closed in 1984.  Broad Bottom was a flag stop on the Big Sandy Subdivision of the Chesapeake and Ohio Railway.

References

Unincorporated communities in Pike County, Kentucky
Unincorporated communities in Kentucky